85th NBR Awards
Best Film: 
Her

The 85th National Board of Review Awards, honoring the best in film for 2013, were announced on December 4, 2013.

Top 10 Films
Films listed alphabetically except top, which is ranked as Best Film of the Year:

Her
12 Years a Slave
Fruitvale Station
Gravity
Inside Llewyn Davis
Lone Survivor
Nebraska
Prisoners
Saving Mr. Banks
The Secret Life of Walter Mitty
The Wolf of Wall Street

Top Foreign Films
Beyond the Hills
Gloria
The Grandmaster
A Hijacking
The Hunt

Top Documentaries 
20 Feet from Stardom
The Act of Killing
After Tiller
Casting By
The Square

Top Independent Films 
Ain't Them Bodies Saints
Dallas Buyers Club
In a World...
Mother of George
Much Ado About Nothing
Mud
The Place Beyond the Pines
Short Term 12
Sightseers
The Spectacular Now

Winners

Best Film:
Her

Best Director:
Spike Jonze, Her

Best Actor:
Bruce Dern, Nebraska

Best Actress:
Emma Thompson, Saving Mr. Banks

Best Supporting Actor:
Will Forte, Nebraska

Best Supporting Actress:
Octavia Spencer, Fruitvale Station

Best Original Screenplay:
Joel and Ethan Coen, Inside Llewyn Davis

Best Adapted Screenplay:
Terence Winter, The Wolf of Wall Street

Best Animated Feature:
The Wind Rises

Creative Innovation in Filmmaking:
Gravity

Breakthrough Actor:
Michael B. Jordan, Fruitvale Station

Breakthrough Actress:
Adèle Exarchopoulos, Blue Is the Warmest Colour

Best Directorial Debut:
Ryan Coogler, Fruitvale Station

Best Foreign Language Film:
The Past

Best Documentary:
Stories We Tell

William K. Everson Film History Award:
George Stevens Jr.

Best Ensemble:
Prisoners

Spotlight Award:
Career collaboration of Martin Scorsese and Leonardo DiCaprio

NBR Freedom of Expression:
Wadjda

National Board of Review Awards
2013 film awards
2013 in American cinema